This is a list of notable inmates who were once held at the United States Penitentiary, Administrative Maximum Facility, the federal supermax prison in Florence, Colorado.

For details about the facility, including a list of notable inmates who  are currently held there, please see the United States Penitentiary, ADX Florence page.  In the context of these individuals, "Residential Reentry Management Offices" are among other things the accounting placeholder for federal inmates being held in state institutions.  This is usually as part of the "Interstate Compact for Corrections" which provides for the transfer of inmates from one state to another, or from federal to state custody or vice versa Simply put, if a state has an inmate that they cannot easily hold, either for security or medical reasons, then they can transfer that inmate to federal custody and in return the state agrees to provide custody for a federal inmate.

Notable former inmates

See also
List of U.S. federal prisons
Federal Bureau of Prisons
Incarceration in the United States

References

Lists of prisoners and detainees